Co’Motion Dance Theater is a professional modern dance company based in Ames, Iowa, founded in 1978  by dancer Valerie Williams. The company maintains a three performance season within the Ames area.

About the Company 
Co’Motion Dance Theater (CMDT) is a professional modern dance company based in Ames, Iowa.

Co'Motion Dance Theater hosts three fully produced concerts each year - one with a small cast, using only professional performers, one with a large cast including professionals and local amateur dancers, and one Women in Motion performance.

Education 
Co’Motion Dance Theater's two main education programs are Kids Co’Motion and Women in Motion.

Kids Co'Motion (KCM) is a three-week program for children ages 8–18 ending with a production at the Ames City Auditorium.
Women in Motion is a semester long dance intensive program for women.

External links

References 

Modern dance companies
1978 establishments in Iowa
Ames, Iowa